Schwarzbach is a river of Thuringia, Germany. It is a left tributary of the Werra, which it joins near Wasungen.

See also
List of rivers of Thuringia

Rivers of Thuringia
Rivers of Germany